N. Satyen (1932–2002) was a cinematographer in Bollywood who had a career spanning over 50 years. He was born and raised in Mysore, Karnataka, and moved to Mumbai in the 1960s.

Filmography
Zulmi (1999)
Mohabbat Ke Dushman (1988)
Muqaddar Ka Faisla (1987)
Bal Bramhachari (1996)
Dalaal (1993)
Zindagi Ek Juaa (1992) 
Sharaabi (1984)
Laawaris (1981)
Jwalamukhi (1980) (director of photography) 
Hera Pheri (1976) (as N. Satyan)
Himalay Se Ooncha (1975) (director of photography)
Zanjeer (1973) 
Haseena Maan Jayegi (1968)
Bluff Master (1963)

Special Effects cameraman:
Anari No. 1 (1999) (special effects camera) (as N. Satyan) 
Haseena Maan Jayegi (1968) (special effects)

References

External links
http://in.movies.yahoo.com/artists/N-Satyen/summary-9049.html
http://www.imdb.com/name/nm0766472/

Artists from Mysore
1932 births
2002 deaths
Hindi film cinematographers
Cinematographers from Karnataka
20th-century Indian photographers
Artists from Mumbai